České Budějovice railway station is a mainline railway station and marshalling yard in České Budějovice in the Czech Republic. It is located at the junction of an international corridor leading from Prague south to Linz in Austria with several domestic lines. The Neo-Renaissance station building, completed in 1908, is located on Nádražní street, a short walk east of the old town. Most passenger services are operated by Czech Railways but some are operated by Arriva.

History

The history of rail transport in České Budějovice began as early as 1828 with the opening of a horse-drawn railway to Linz, but it was not until 1868 when a new line to Plzeň was opened that a station was built for locomotives. At the beginning of the 20th century, as the railways continued to grow, a much larger station was constructed on the same tracks a short distance north of the old one. The station building was designed by Gustav Kulhavý in Neo-Renaissance style and constructed by J. M. Kohler & son. It was opened in 1908, and the first train to call at the station was an express train from Trieste to Prague on 17 December of that year.

Reconstruction

In 2016, the station was acquired by the Railway Infrastructure Administration Company (Cz: Správa železniční dopravní cesty, or SŽDC), who plan to renovate the station at a cost of approximately 150 million Czech koruna, with work beginning in 2018.

Services

The station is served by one express route and three long-distance routes operated by Czech Railways.

References

External links

Railway stations opened in 1868
Railway stations in South Bohemian Region
Buildings and structures in České Budějovice
Renaissance Revival architecture in the Czech Republic
Czech Republic